The meteorological history of Hurricane Dean began in the second week of August 2007 when a vigorous tropical wave moved off the west coast of Africa into the North Atlantic ocean.  Although the wave initially experienced strong easterly wind shear, it quickly moved into an environment better suited for tropical development and gained organization.  On the morning of August 13, the National Hurricane Center recognized the system's organization and designated it Tropical Depression Four while it was still more than 1,500 mi (2,400 km) east of the Lesser Antilles.

A deep layered ridge to its north steered the system west as it moved rapidly towards the Caribbean and into warmer waters. On August 14 the depression gained strength and was upgraded to Tropical Storm Dean. By August 16, the storm had intensified further and attained hurricane status. Hurricane Dean continued to intensify as it tracked westward through the Lesser Antilles. Once in the Caribbean Sea, the storm rapidly intensified to a Category 5 hurricane on the Saffir-Simpson Hurricane Scale. Weakening slightly, it brushed the southern coast of Jamaica on August 19 as a Category 4 hurricane and continued towards the Yucatán Peninsula through even warmer waters.  The favorable conditions of the western Caribbean Sea allowed the storm to intensify and it regained Category 5 status the next day before making landfall in southern Quintana Roo.

Hurricane Dean was one of two storms in the 2007 Atlantic hurricane season to make landfall as a Category 5 hurricane and was the seventh most intense Atlantic hurricane ever recorded, tied with Camille and Mitch. After its first landfall, Hurricane Dean crossed the Yucatán Peninsula and emerged, weakened, into the Bay of Campeche. It briefly restrengthened in the warm waters of the bay before making a second landfall in Veracruz. Dean progressed to the northwest, weakening into a remnant low which finally dissipated over the southwestern United States.

Formation

On August 11, 2007, a vigorous tropical wave moved off the west coast of Africa, producing disorganized showers and thunderstorms. It encountered conditions favorable for gradual development, and on August 12 it gained organization and became a low. Strong upper-level easterly winds slowed development, but on August 13 the tropical wave gained enough organization that the National Hurricane Center designated it Tropical Depression Four. At this time it was centered about 520 mi (835 km) west-southwest of Cape Verde.

The depression was already exhibiting persistent deep convection in the western portion of its circulation. It moved quickly westward, south of a deep layered ridge, escaping the easterly wind shear that had been slowing its development and moving over warmer waters. At 1500 UTC on August 14, the depression was upgraded to Tropical Storm Dean while still 1450 mi (2300 km) east of Barbados. Even as its convection waned slightly that afternoon, its intensity grew, and convection flared in the center that night. Dry air and cooler air inflow from the north slowed structural development; nevertheless, ragged bands began to form on August 15. By mid-morning, a rough banding eye had formed, and by the next morning a full eye developed. The storm was upgraded to Hurricane Dean at 0900 UTC August 16, 550 mi (890 km) east of Barbados.

A strong ridge of high pressure continued to push the system west, towards the Caribbean Sea. That afternoon, convective banding and increasing upper-level outflow strengthened the storm to a Category 2 hurricane on the Saffir-Simpson Hurricane Scale. The eye disappeared briefly overnight, possibly as part of a diurnal fluctuation, but returned by the morning of August 17.

Caribbean Sea and first landfall

At 0930 UTC on August 17, the center of Hurricane Dean passed into the Caribbean Sea through the Saint Lucia Channel between the islands of Martinique and St. Lucia. The northern eyewall passed over Martinique where a weather station in the island's capital of Fort-de-France reported 13 in (33 cm) of rainfall. By this time the eyewall had closed, forming a distinct eye, and in an environment of low wind shear and increasing ocean temperature the hurricane began to intensify rapidly. Hurricane Dean strengthened to a Category 3 hurricane by the evening of August 17. Satellite imagery showed that a well defined eye and numerous cyclonically curved convective bands remained over the Lesser Antilles. That evening, another reconnaissance aircraft reached the hurricane and discovered that it had strengthened into a Category 4 hurricane, and by 0600 UTC on August 18, Dean reached Category 5 intensity for the first time with 165 mph (270 km/h) winds. The storm's wind radii increased in all quadrants as the storm grew in both intensity and size. At 0800 UTC August 18, Hurricane Dean passed directly over NOAA sea buoy 42059 which reported a significant wave height (average size of the largest 33% of waves) of 33 ft (10 m). On August 18, Hurricane Dean developed a double eyewall, indicating that an eyewall replacement cycle was taking place and causing short term fluctuations in intensity as Dean weakened back to a Category 4 hurricane. That afternoon the hurricane continued to improve its outflow, and its numerous spiral bands gave it a well defined satellite presentation. Hurricane Dean finished the eyewall replacement cycle early on August 19 with some trochoidal wobbles.

On the morning of August 19, the storm remained slightly weakened from its peak strength. As a Category 4 hurricane with wind speeds between 140 mph (220 km/h) and 145 mph (230 km/h), the center of Hurricane Dean passed 90 mi (150 km) south of Haiti, and that evening passed 25 mi (40 km) south of Jamaica. Two weather stations on the island of Jamaica, one at Ingleside and the other at Morant Bay, both reported in excess of 13 in (33 cm) of rainfall. In contrast, the weather station at Les Cayes, Haiti recorded only 1.18 in (3 cm) of rainfall.

Hurricane Dean intensified through the night of August 19 and reinforced its completed eyewall replacement cycle by forming a tight single-walled eye. At 0100 UTC August 20, the storm passed 120 mi (190 km) to the south of Sea Buoy 42056, which recorded a significant wave height of 36 ft (11 m). A concentric eyewall was briefly observed again on the morning of August 20, but it did not last long. In conditions of low wind shear, Hurricane Dean moved westward over waters with increasingly high heat content, and the storm exhibited a classic upper-tropospheric outflow pattern. The high pressure system over the southeastern United States continued to steer the storm west towards the Yucatán Peninsula. The eyewall became even better defined throughout the day. The cloud tops cooled, the minimum central pressure fell, and its winds increased to 160 mph (260 km/h), making Hurricane Dean a Category 5 hurricane once again. This time, it was less than 210 mi (335 km) from its first landfall.

Although many of the convective bands were already located over the Yucatán Peninsula, Hurricane Dean continued to intensify until the eye made landfall. As the eye moved over Mexico near the town of Majahual in the Costa Maya area, the NHC estimated surface level winds of 175 mph (280 km/h), making Dean the first storm to make landfall as a Category 5 hurricane in the Atlantic basin since Hurricane Andrew in 1992. At the same time, a dropsonde reading from the hurricane's eye estimated a central pressure of 905 mbar, making Dean the third most intense landfalling Atlantic storm in history (after the Labor Day Hurricane of 1935 and Hurricane Gilbert of 1988) and tying Dean with Camille and Mitch as the seventh most intense hurricane ever recorded in the Atlantic basin. The landfall itself occurred in a sparsely populated area of the Costa Maya region of the Mexican state of Quintana Roo near 18.7 N 87.8 W at 0900 UTC August 21 and brought with it a storm surge of 12–18 ft (3.7–5.5 m). A weather station at Chetumal (the capital of Quintana Roo, Mexico) reported 6.65 in (17 cm) of rainfall during Hurricane Dean's landfall. As expected, the landfall caused significant weakening of the storm; the eye filled and the cold cloud-tops warmed. The land severely disrupted the storm's organization, and by the time Dean crossed the Yucatán Peninsula it had weakened to a Category 1 hurricane.

Gulf of Mexico and demise
Hurricane Dean emerged into the Bay of Campeche as a Category 1 hurricane on the afternoon of August 21. Its inner core was largely disrupted, so although a ragged eye reformed over the warm waters of the bay, the hurricane no longer had the structure to support its previous strength. Nevertheless, the warm waters of the bay proved conducive for some development and the eye contracted overnight, indicating that the hurricane was regaining structure. With better structure came stronger winds of 100 mph (160 km/h), and the storm was re-categorized as a Category 2 hurricane.

The storm's strengthening pattern continued until Hurricane Dean made its second and final landfall at 1630 UTC August 22 near Tecolutla, Veracruz, just east of Gutiérrez Zamora and about 40 mi (65 km) south-southeast of Tuxpan. A weather station at Requetemu, San Luis Potosí, recorded 15.4 in (39 cm) of rainfall during the storm's second landfall. Dean weakened rapidly, losing its low level circulation within hours and its mid-level circulation the next day as it encountered the Sierra Madre Oriental mountain range. Its remnants passed over the mountains and into the eastern Pacific Ocean as a broad area of low pressure. Hurricane Dean's remnant low pressure system then drifted north into southern California, bringing thunderstorms to northern San Diego County, and more than 2 in (5 cm) of rain to Lake Wohlford. In Escondido almost 2 in (5 cm) of rain fell in 90 minutes. The remnant low pressure system weakened over western Arizona and southern California before finally dissipating on August 30.

See also

 List of Atlantic hurricanes
 List of Category 5 Atlantic hurricanes

References

External links

National Hurricane Center archive on Hurricane Dean

Hurricane Dean
Dean (2007)
Dean Meteorological History